Valdemar Wickholm (7 November 1890 – 20 July 1970) was a Finnish track and field athlete who competed in the 1912 Summer Olympics in the decathlon and the 110 metres hurdles. He finished seventh overall in the decathlon, placing best in the pole vault, where he was joint third. He competed at the next Olympics eight years later, in both the decathlon and 400 metres hurdles.

See also 
 Finland at the 1912 Summer Olympics
 Finland at the 1920 Summer Olympics

References

External links 
 

1890 births
1970 deaths
Finnish decathletes
Finnish male hurdlers
Olympic athletes of Finland
Athletes (track and field) at the 1912 Summer Olympics
Athletes (track and field) at the 1920 Summer Olympics
Olympic decathletes
Place of birth missing